"Turd Blossom" (or Sand Turd) is a Texan United States term for a flower which grows from a pile of cow dung. As Turd Blossom, the term has gained fame in the United States as a nickname that was reportedly assigned by former U.S. President George W. Bush as a term of endearment for his former chief political advisor, Karl Rove.

In July 2005, several newspapers declined to run two Doonesbury comic strips portraying Bush addressing Rove by this nickname.

References

Presidency of George W. Bush
Nicknames of politicians
American slang
Texas culture